Miangul Adnan Aurangzeb (11 January 1960 – 30 May 2022) was a Pakistani engineer, and a member of Parliament MNA.

Family
He was head of the former princely family which once ruled Swat princely state. He was the eldest son of Miangul Aurangzeb and the eldest grandson of Miangul Jahan Zeb (the last ruler). After the death of his father in 2014, he had become the unofficial Wāli of Swat. His maternal grandfather was the former President of Pakistan Ayub Khan.

Education
He studied at the primary level within the Sangota Public School system in Sangota, Swat. He graduated on the secondary level from Aitchison College, an elite Pakistani secondary school. He was a professional electrical engineer who studied in the United States at Northeastern University in Boston, Massachusetts.

Politics
He served in the National Assembly of Pakistan from 1997 to 1999.

Engineering business
Miangul Adnan Aurangzeb was a consulting energy engineer for project management and government relations. Miangul Adnan Aurangzeb was a volunteer spokesperson for Project Miracles an initiative to recover and recycle plastic waste from the Indus Valley.

Death
Miangul Adnan Aurangzeb died in a highway crash on 30 May 2022. He had attended a conference on archaeology at Hazara University in Mansehra and was driving home.

Bibliography
 Miangul Adnan Aurangzeb, "Flashback, The Wali of Swat", The Express Tribune, 4 August 2014.

References

External links
Pakistanis fear resurgence of violence in Swat Valley
Visit to Sikh refugees from Buner and Swat

1961 births
2022 deaths
Pakistani MNAs 1997–1999
Northeastern University alumni
People from Swat District
Aitchison College alumni
Swat royal family
Nawabs of Pakistan